TwinStrata is a corporate cloud storage company with its head office in Natick, Massachusetts. The business was formed in 2007 by Nicos Vekiarides and John Bates and was acquired by EMC Corporation in 2014.  The CloudArray product from TwinStrata was first unveiled as a virtual appliance in May 2010 and as a hardware appliance in September 2010. CloudArray was described as a cloud storage gateway.

References

External links
 

Cloud storage gateways